is a retired Japanese judoka.

Yoshimura is from Kumamoto, Kumamoto. He belonged to Tokyo Metropolitan Police Department after graduation from Nihon University in 1973.

In 1973, When Yoshimura was a student of university, he won a bronze medal at the World Championships held in Lausanne.

He was expected to get gold medal of World Championships in 1977 or Olympic Games in 1980. But he couldn't because World Championship was cancelled and Olympic Games was boycotted by Japanese Government.

Among his students is former world champion, Toshihiko Koga and Hidehiko Yoshida.

As of 2010, He has coached  All-Japan women's judo team since 1997.
On November 2012 he resigned as the women's trainer and was replaced by Hitoshi Saito.

Achievements 
1969 - Inter-highschool championships (-80 kg) 1st
1970 - All-Japan Junior Championships (-63 kg) 3rd
1971 - All-Japan Junior Championships (-80 kg) 1st
1972 - All-Japan Selected Championships (-70 kg) 3rd
1973 - World Championships (-70 kg) 3rd
1976 - All-Japan Selected Championships (-70 kg) 2nd
 - Kodokan Cup (-71 kg) 1st
1977 - All-Japan Selected Championships (-71 kg) 1st
1978 - Jigoro Kano Cup (-71 kg) 1st
 - All-Japan Selected Championships (-71 kg) 2nd
1979 - Super World Cup Paris (-71 kg) 1st
 - All-Japan Selected Championships (-71 kg) 2nd

References 

Japanese male judoka
People from Kumamoto
1951 births
Living people
Nihon University alumni